Tom Clancy's is a branding used by video game company Ubisoft for several video games, some of which feature the works of American author Tom Clancy, while others do not. Various sub-series are often unrelated to each other with a few exceptions, although most are shooters set in modern or near-future military settings.

History
In 1996, Clancy co-founded the video game developer Red Storm Entertainment. He has had his name on several of Red Storm's most successful games. Red Storm was later bought by publisher Ubisoft, which continued to use the Clancy name, though the extent of Clancy's actual involvement with creation of the games and development of intellectual properties, if any, was unclear. This game series includes:
 The Hunt for Red October (1987): Submarine simulation loosely based on the novel of the same name. Produced by Grandslam Entertainment for IBM PC, C64, and Amiga.
 Red Storm Rising (1988): Submarine sim loosely based on the novel of the same name. Produced by MicroProse for IBM PC, C64, and Amiga.
 The Hunt for Red October (1990): Submarine sim based on the movie of the same name. Produced by Grandslam Entertainment for Amiga, Amstrad CPC, Atari ST, C64, DOS, and ZX Spectrum.
 The Hunt for Red October (1990): Submarine sim based on the movie of the same name. Produced for NES , Game Boy, and SNES.
 The Cardinal of the Kremlin (1991): Management simulation based on the novel of the same name. Produced by Capstone Software for Amiga and DOS.
 SSN (1996): Submarine sim based on the novel of the same name. Produced by Simon & Schuster Interactive for IBM PC.
 ruthless.com (1998) by Red Storm Entertainment: Strategy game based loosely on the book of the same name.
 Shadow Watch (2000): Turn-based strategy based on the Power Plays novel of the same name.
 The Sum of All Fears (2002): Tactical first-person shooter similar in style to Rainbow Six, but based on the Ghost Recon engine. The plot is based on the movie of the same name. Produced by Ubisoft for Microsoft Windows and Nintendo GameCube system.

In 2008, Ubisoft acquired perpetual rights to use Clancy's name and works for video games and other related media including books and film.

Games

Rainbow Six (1998–present)
The Rainbow Six series: Squad-based first person tactical shooters, based on the novel of the same name, typically taking place in closed urban environments. 15 Rainbow Six games have been produced so far.

Ghost Recon (2001–present)
The Ghost Recon series: Squad-based first-and third-person tactical shooters. Unlike Rainbow Six, Ghost Recon usually takes place in larger, outdoor environments. There have been 15 Ghost Recon games so far.

Splinter Cell (2002–present)
The Splinter Cell series: action-adventure third-person shooter covert-ops stealth games; lately spawned a line of books written by a series of different authors, all writing under the pseudonym David Michaels.

Endwar (2008–2014)
The EndWar series: Real-time tactics strategic war game; set in a speculative World War III, taking place in 2020.

H.A.W.X. (2009–2010)
H.A.W.X. series: Combat-based arcade flight video games.

The Division (2016–present)

Tom Clancy's The Division is a 2016 online-only action role-playing third-person shooter video game developed by Massive Entertainment and published by Ubisoft, with assistance from Red Storm Entertainment, for Microsoft Windows, PlayStation 4 and Xbox One. The Division is set in a dystopian New York City in the aftermath of a smallpox pandemic; the player, who is an agent of the titular Strategic Homeland Division, commonly referred to as simply "The Division", is tasked with helping to rebuild the Division's operations in Manhattan, investigating the nature of the outbreak and combating criminal activity in its wake. The Division is structured with elements of role-playing games, as well as collaborative and player versus player online multiplayer.

The game received positive reviews, and was a commercial success, with Ubisoft stating that the game broke the company's record for highest number of first-day sales. Furthermore, one week after the game's release, Ubisoft stated that The Division is the company's bestselling game, and the industry's biggest first-week launch for a new game franchise, generating an estimated amount of $330 million.

Other 
 Tom Clancy's Elite Squad (Closed)
 XDefiant (TBA)

References

Ubisoft franchises
Video game franchises
Lists of video games by franchise
Tom Clancy games